Fairmont is a town in Robeson County, North Carolina, United States. The population was 2,663 at the 2010 Census.

History

Fairmont was originally known as Ashpole in homage to the nearby Ashpole Swamp. It was incorporated as Union City in 1899, but the name was changed back to Ashpole in 1901. Six years later the name was changed to Fairmont.

The first settlers to this area received land grants from the Lords Proprietors and worked in  the logging and naval stores industries producing lumber, turpentine and pitch for ships. The Bufort County Lumber Company opened in the northern section of town in the late 1890s employing 300 men and becoming one of the largest lumber companies in the south. By the late 19th century, a thriving tobacco market had been established as well. The railroads later followed to rapidly move these goods. By the early 20th century, tobacco became king, and by the mid-1950s, Fairmont was considered one of the major tobacco markets in the world. Based upon its 1950 population of a little over 2,000 Fairmont was considered as the "biggest little tobacco market in the world. In 1951 Fairmont sold twice as much tobacco as was grown in Robeson County.  As health concerns have affected the sales of tobacco, many local farmers have turned to other cash crops, mainly corn, soybeans and wheat. The Border Belt Farmers Museum  was established in 1989 by converting an unused former railroad depot into a museum filled with farming, tobacco related, and historical memorabilia. It is open five days a week (M, W, F-11:00-3:00 & T, TH 9-12:00 & 1:00-3:00). The town has recently started promoting itself as "the shortest route to the S.C. beaches" by encouraging motorists traveling south on Interstate 95 to take exit 10. The advertising campaign, utilizing a very prominent billboard on the interstate, has resulted in a higher traffic flow and increased commercial traffic to the community.

Scenes from the movie Arthur Newman were filmed here.

The Fairmont Commercial Historic District was listed on the National Register of Historic Places in 2010.

Geography
Fairmont is located at  (34.498004, -79.114713). The town lies within the Carolina Border Belt, a regional network of tobacco markets and warehouses along both sides of the North Carolina-South Carolina border.

Demographics

2020 census

As of the 2020 United States census, there were 2,191 people, 1,046 households, and 644 families residing in the town.

2010 census
As of the 2010 United States Census, there were 2,663 people living in the town. The racial makeup of the town was 56.0% Black, 26.0% White, 13.3% Native American, 0.2% Asian, 0.1% from some other race and 2.5% from two or more races. 1.9% were Hispanic or Latino of any race.

2000 census
As of the census of 2000, there were 2,604 people, 1,078 households, and 685 families living in the town. The population density was 1,171.4 people per square mile (452.9/km2). There were 1,186 housing units at an average density of 533.5 per square mile (206.3/km2). The racial makeup of the town was 30.26% White, 58.68% African American, 9.87% Native American, 0.23% Asian, 0.46% from other races, and 0.50% from two or more races. Hispanic or Latino of any race were 0.58% of the population.

There were 1,078 households, out of which 27.4% had children under the age of 18 living with them, 33.0% were married couples living together, 27.1% had a female householder with no husband present, and 36.4% were non-families. 33.7% of all households were made up of individuals, and 18.6% had someone living alone who was 65 years of age or older. The average household size was 2.32 and the average family size was 2.95.

In the town, the population was spread out, with 25.5% under the age of 18, 8.0% from 18 to 24, 21.7% from 25 to 44, 24.4% from 45 to 64, and 20.4% who were 65 years of age or older. The median age was 41 years. For every 100 females, there were 77.4 males. For every 100 females age 18 and over, there were 66.5 males.

The median income for a household in the town was $17,194, and the median income for a family was $28,409. Males had a median income of $28,597 versus $17,716 for females. The per capita income for the town was $12,006. About 30.4% of families and 32.9% of the population were below the poverty line, including 42.9% of those under age 18 and 32.0% of those age 65 or over.

Notable people
 Joy J. Johnson, Baptist minister and state legislator
 Effie Neal Jones, civil rights activist
 Joseph Mitchell, American writer
 Thomas Avery Nye, Jr., politician

References

Works cited

External links
 Official Fairmont, NC website

Towns in Robeson County, North Carolina
Towns in North Carolina